Eriogonum molle, known by common name as the Cedros soft buckwheat, is a species of wild buckwheat endemic to Cedros Island, Mexico.

Description 
A shrubby plant, the leafy branches of Eriogonum molle reach about a foot or two high. The leaves are oblong, and obtuse at both ends, and are 2 to 4 inches long, attached to petioles nearly as long, cinereous above and beneath, with a dense, short, velvety pubescence and altogether devoid of white wool. The involucres are few, many-flowered, and corymbose on top of stout, naked peduncles that are a foot or two long.

Taxonomy 
This species was discovered by Edward Lee Greene on a journey to the northern end of Cedros Island. He later described it in the first volume of Pittonia.

Distribution and habitat 
This plant is only known from the rocky, extreme northern end of Cedros Island, scattered along summits and ridges. It shares a community with primarily succulent species, such as Agave sebastiana, Dudleya albiflora and Dudleya pachyphytum, all fed by the marine fog that frequently covers the northern end of the island.

References 

Flora of Baja California
molle
Taxa named by Edward Lee Greene
Plants described in 1888